Khusf (also Romanized as Khūsf and Khoosaf) is a city in the Central District of Khusf County, South Khorasan province, Iran, and serves as capital of the county. At the 2006 census, its population was 3,186 in 929 households, when it was in the former Khusf District of Birjand County. The following census in 2011 counted 4,920 people in 1,221 households.

The latest census in 2016 showed a population of 5,716 people in 1,544 households, by which time the district had been separated from the county and Khusf County established with two new districts and Khusf as its capital.

References 

Khusf County

Cities in South Khorasan Province

Populated places in South Khorasan Province

Populated places in Khusf County